is the second major label single by the Japanese kawaii metal band Babymetal. It was released in Japan on June 19, 2013 as the fifth single from the album Babymetal. It is also the first single released independently from the idol group Sakura Gakuin.

Release and promotion 
The single was first announced for a June release on April 1, 2013. The single was released in four versions: a standard edition and three limited editions. The "Ki", "Tsu", and "Ne" (Kitsune means "fox" in Japanese) limited editions included single artwork focused on Nakamoto, Mizuno, and Kikuchi respectively, and their included DVDs feature footage of two songs from each of the live performances from Live: Legend I, D, Z Apocalypse. Additionally, the single included a chance to contain a ticket to the premium event Kitsune Festival at Meguro Rock May Kan on July 14, 2013.

To promote the release, the band was featured in the June issue of Marquee and on the cover of the July issue of Hedoban, in addition to collaborating with Tower Records for the 34th rendition of the event No Music, No Idol?.

Babymetal Death Match Tour 2013: May Revolution 

The  was a promotional concert tour by Babymetal, occurring in conjunction with the promotion of "Megitsune". The band performed four shows, with two on the final tour date, at the same venue. Customers who purchased tickets to the tour could receive an exclusive edition of the single, with a remix by Yuyoyuppe, under the name DJ'Tekina//Something.

According to Mizuno, the tour was designed to be a "training tour". During each of the four shows the three members wore stage costumes for the eras of "Doki Doki ☆ Morning" (which had become nostalgically small for them), "Headbangeeeeerrrrr!!!!!", and "Ijime, Dame, Zettai", respectively, with the final show premiering new costumes for "Megitsune".

Composition

"Megitsune" 
"Megitsune" has been described as "festival metal". Alongside the serious heavy metal tone, there is a mix of Western-style and Eastern-style music, noticeably with the use of Japanese traditional instruments. Unlike screams in traditional heavy metal, "Megitsune" is filled with festival chants by Mizuno and Kikuchi like "wasshoi" and "sore sore", while Nakamoto sings in the melodramatic style of enka. The bridge has significant variety in genre, with elements of dubstep as well as interpolations from the traditional Japanese folk song "Sakura Sakura".

The song contains lyrics such as "from the time of birth, women are actresses" which reflect on the song's theme of women remaining strong when living with their varied facial expressions. The song relates foxes, which disguises themselves for deception in Japanese mythology, to women, who disguise themselves with makeup. According to Nakamoto, foxes are similar to women as they can keep their true feeling hidden, even through hard times, leaving a cool impression. The last chorus contains the phrase , which is also famously said by Masako Natsume's character in the 1982 yakuza film "Onimasa"; whether or not this was intentional has never been confirmed.

Recording had begun shortly after "Ijime, Dame, Zettai", with a tone reminiscent of "Doki Doki ☆ Morning" and "Iine!". After several rounds of remixing, taiko drums were added while the lyrics remained the same. In a Billboard interview about the band's album Metal Resistance, Su-metal explained that the song "is popular among international fans, and I have a feeling that "Karate" will be something close to "Megitsune."" George Garner of Kerrang! called the song "the most hyper song [Babymetal] have ever put their name to."

Other songs 
Performed solely by Nakamoto,  is considered to be in the genre of speed metal. The song debuted as background music during the first live performance of "Iine!". Nakamoto went through voice training as the song was challenging with high tones. With more performances, her vocal performance improved as she stopped singing flat. Being her first solo, Nakamoto felt accomplished being able to sing the entire song by herself. While writing about the band's performance at Wembley Arena, Mark Beaumont contrasted it with the previous songs "Awadama Fever", "Iine!", and "Yava!", stating it had a darker tone, as "a show-tune ballad sung by Su-metal in a black cape, running along a flame-flanked ego ramp".

Under the stage name "Black Babymetal", Mizuno and Kikuchi perform  in the style of rap metal, with dialogue-style lyrics in the nature of small devils. Due to the childish nature of the lyrics, Mizuno sang the song like a baby. Nakamoto has background vocals in the chorus, in a cool manner.  Daniel Robson of The Guardian called the lyrics of Babymetal "delightfully tongue-in-cheek", explaining how "Onedari Daisakusen" "offers practical advice to teens on how to extract extra pocket money from one’s father with a well-timed shoulder-massage/flattery combo".

Reception 
"Megitsune" received positive acclaim from music critics. Tomonori Shiba of M-ON! Press wrote that "Megitsune" has an intro filled with the shamisen, bass guitar, synths, and flying shouts of "Sore! Sore!", signifying its festival-like nature, fusing the genres of metalcore and "wa" (和; Japanese elements). Like the music of Crossfaith and Fear, and Loathing in Las Vegas, it contains elements of electro-trance music. He further compared Nakamoto's vocal performance to that of Evanescence band member Amy Lee, calling the line "Kitsune. Kitsune. I am Megitsune" in the bridge stimulating. Patrick St. Michel of The Japan Times considered the song one of the highlights on the album, praising it for not depending on the band's "gimmicks". He further called it and "Doki Doki ☆ Morning" memorable and similarly constructed to "Gimme Chocolate!!".

While reviewing a performance at Brixton Academy, Colin McQuistan of The Huffington Post UK described "Akatsuki" as an opportunity for Nakamoto to "show off her remarkably powerful voice", while "wonderfully bonkers" "Onedari Daisakusen" gave Mizuno and Kikuchi an opportunity to "lead the audience on a wildly merry journey".

The single peaked at number seven on the Oricon Weekly Singles Chart, selling 22,000 copies that week. The song also charted on the Billboard Japan Hot 100, peaking at number 16 in the week of July 1, 2013. It also managed to peak at number two on the Oricon Daily Singles Chart.

"Megitsune" was used as the opening theme for the Japanese talk/variety show .

"Megitsune" is used as one of the two pieces of walk-on music for Japanese darts player Mikuru Suzuki, the other being "Baby Shark" by Pinkfong.

Music video 

The three members are shown dancing in Noh theater alongside the "Kitsune band" (using traditional Japanese instruments) within the traditional scenery of Japan; this forms the significant contrast found in the music (specifically between metal and wa), which has since garnered over 79 million views as of June 2022. In the last chorus, Nakamoto threateningly reveals that her microphone contains a hidden blade, while saying the aforementioned phrase "underestimate maidens at your own peril".

During the shooting of the music video, Kikuchi's outfit tore at the armpit; similar incidents had previously occurred at live performances.

Live performances 

Prior to the release of the single, "Megitsune" was performed live on the Nippon Broadcasting System program MC Plus on June 4, 2013. The band also performed the song at the single's release event Pray for Success with "Inarin" & Mini Live at Tower Records Shibuya on June 22, 2013. The next day, the song was performed again at a free concert at the DiverCity Tokyo Plaza Festival. The band performed the song on the Nippon TV program Music Dragon, which would be broadcast on June 21, 2013. Later, they performed the song on the NHK General TV program Music Japan Annex, which was broadcast on July 16, 2013. In February 2014, the band performed the song with Taiwanese band Chthonic.

During the live performances, Nakamoto is shown holding a Kitsune mask to her face during the bridge, before tossing it out into the crowd.

Track listings and formats 
Standard edition

"Ki", "Tsu", and "Ne" limited edition

May Revolution Exclusive promotional edition

Credits and personnel 
Credits adapted from "Megitsune" standard and limited "Tsu" single liner notes.

Recording and management
 Recorded at ABS Recording, MukuStudio, Sound Arts Studio, S.O.L.I.D. Sound Lab, and Heat [sic] Beat Recording Studio
 Mixed at King Sekiguchidai Studio
 Mastered at Parasight Mastering

Personnel

 Suzuka Nakamoto (SU-METAL) – vocals (lead and background)
 Yui Mizuno (YUIMETAL) – vocals (lead and background)
 Moa Kikuchi (MOAMETAL) – vocals (lead and background)
 Key Kobayashi (KOBAMETAL / KxBxMETAL) – executive producer, arrangement
 Millennium Japan (millennium JAPAN) – executive producer
 Tucky – mastering
 Miki Watanabe (MK-METAL) – lyrics
 Norikazu Nakayama (NORiMETAL / NAKAMETAL / ) – lyrics, music
 Tatsuya Tsubono (TSUBOMETAL) – lyrics, music
 Ryugi Yokoi (RYU-METAL) – lyrics
 Shinichi Fujita (FUJI-METAL) – lyrics

 Shuhei Takahashi (TEAM-K) – music
 Kazuki Higashihara (TEAM-K) – music
 Takehiro Mamiya (Yuyoyuppe / DJ'TEKINA//SOMETHING) – arrangement, audio mixing, remixer
 Kyoto – arrangement
 Tatsuo (tatsuo) – arrangement, guitar, bass
 Masatake Osato – recording
 Naoki Ibaraki – recording
 Seiji Toda – audio mixing
 Hironobu Takikawa – audio mixing
 Leda – guitar

Charts

Weekly charts

Daily charts

Cover versions
Violinist Ayako Ishikawa covered "Megitsune" on the violin; the song appeared on her 2016 album Sakura Symphony.

On December 7, 2014, Sakura Gakuin members Aiko Yamaide and Megumi Okada covered "Onedari Daisakusen" as a "One-Night Shuffle Unit" in the concert Sakura Gakuin ☆ 2014: Celebration in December.

Release history

References

External links 
 Babymetal singles discography - Toy's Factory website

Babymetal songs
Toy's Factory singles
2013 singles
2013 songs
Japanese-language songs
Songs about foxes